"Lose Yourself to Dance" is a song by French electronic music duo Daft Punk featuring vocals from American musician Pharrell Williams. Like their previous collaboration with fellow American musician Nile Rodgers, "Get Lucky", the song was written by Daft Punk, Williams, and Rodgers, for Daft Punk's fourth studio album Random Access Memories (2013).

The song was distributed to radio stations as the second single from the album on 13 August 2013, following the worldwide hit single "Get Lucky". Prior to this release, "Lose Yourself to Dance" charted in various countries, including France, Sweden, Switzerland and the United Kingdom. In the UK, it joined the playlists of BBC Radio 1, BBC Radio 2, and a number of commercial and smaller stations. It reached number 49 in the UK Singles Chart.

Composition

"Lose Yourself to Dance" is a disco and funk song in the key of B  minor  with a tempo of 100 BPM. Daft Punk expressed that the song was the result of a desire to create dance music with live drummers. Thomas Bangalter elaborated that they wished to redefine dance music as "something lighter or something more [primal]", and that the song is meant to evoke the sense of being unified and connected on the dance floor.

Pharrell Williams sings lead vocals on "Lose Yourself to Dance". Williams stated that the song "makes me feel like walking down the street in the middle of the night in London and it's 1984, 1985. I don't hear '70s in that at all." He also believed that David Bowie could theoretically have sung the song. Additional vocals are performed by Daft Punk using vocoders, which Nick DeCosemo of Mixmag felt resembled their 2001 song "Harder, Better, Faster, Stronger". 

Instrumentalists who perform on "Lose Yourself to Dance" include Nile Rodgers on guitar, Nathan East on bass guitar, and John "J.R." Robinson on drums. Its "heavy beats" are said to resemble American rock singer Billy Squier's 1980 song "The Big Beat". Jeremy Abbott of Mixmag felt that, "Big multi-layered claps and thrashing cymbals also play a big part in driving the song forward."

Promotion

In the third episode of the promotional web series The Collaborators, Nile Rodgers performed a portion of "Lose Yourself to Dance", which was referred to only as "the song of the summer" by the interviewer. The title was later revealed through Columbia Records's official Vine account as part of a video relaying a series of images. A four-minute edit of the song was distributed to mainstream and rhythmic radio stations in the United States on 13 August 2013.

Music video
Rodgers stated that video footage had been shot for "Lose Yourself to Dance" at the same time that "Get Lucky" footage was being filmed. A trailer for "Lose Yourself to Dance" debuted at the 2013 MTV Video Music Awards, featuring Daft Punk, Rodgers and Williams, who also presented the award for "Best Female Video" at the ceremony. The song-length version of the video was released on Daft Punk's official Vevo channel on 16 September 2013. Produced by Daft Arts, the music video was directed by Daft Punk, Warren Fu, Paul Hahn and Cédric Hervet.

Personnel
Credits adapted from Random Access Memories liner notes.

 Daft Punk – production, vocals
 Pharrell Williams – vocals
 Nile Rodgers – guitar
 Nathan East – bass
 John "J.R." Robinson – drums

Track listing

Promotional CD
"Lose Yourself to Dance" (radio edit) – 4:09
"Lose Yourself to Dance" (album version) – 5:53

Chart performance

Weekly charts

Year-end charts

Certifications

Release history

See also
 List of number-one dance singles of 2013 (U.S.)

References

Daft Punk songs
Pharrell Williams songs
Songs written by Guy-Manuel de Homem-Christo
Songs written by Thomas Bangalter
Songs written by Nile Rodgers
Songs written by Pharrell Williams
Funk songs
2013 singles
2013 songs
Columbia Records singles
Songs about dancing
Music videos directed by Warren Fu
Disco songs